Sean Cleary (born 26 February 1983) is a football player from Northern Ireland.

He signed for Cliftonville from Ards in July 2005. He started his career with Cliftonville well, making his debut against Larne in July 2005 and winning the Player of the Month award two months later. Although he was injured for most of the 2006–07 season, he still managed to score three goals.

Cleary went out on loan to Armagh City at the beginning of the 2007–08 season, but returned later in the season as Cliftonville challenged for the Irish Premier League title. However, in July 2008 he was told to leave the club following "a breach of club discipline".

In September 2008 he moved to Larne. In August 2013 he joined Crusaders, scoring once in six appearances before his release later that season.

References

Association footballers from Northern Ireland
Living people
Ards F.C. players
Cliftonville F.C. players
Armagh City F.C. players
Larne F.C. players
Donegal Celtic F.C. players
Crusaders F.C. players
1983 births
Association football midfielders